National Assembly Square may refer to 
National Assembly Square, Sophia, Bulgaria
National Assembly Square, Chișinău, Moldova

See also
Parliament Square (disambiguation)